Rubén Alonso Castellanos España (born 18 January 1997) is a Guatemalan badminton player. He won the men's doubles bronze medals at the 2017 and 2021 Pan Am Championships. He also part of the national team that won the bronze medal at the 2018 Central American and Caribbean Games in Barranquilla, Colombia.

Achievements

Pan Am Championships 
Men's doubles

BWF International Challenge/Series (8 titles, 7 runners-up) 
Men's singles

Men's doubles

Mixed doubles

  BWF International Challenge tournament
  BWF International Series tournament
  BWF Future Series tournament

References

External links 
 

1997 births
Living people
People from Izabal Department
Guatemalan male badminton players
Badminton players at the 2019 Pan American Games
Pan American Games competitors for Guatemala
Central American and Caribbean Games bronze medalists for Guatemala
Competitors at the 2018 Central American and Caribbean Games
Central American and Caribbean Games medalists in badminton